Newbottle may refer to the following places in England:

Newbottle, Northamptonshire
Newbottle, Tyne and Wear